"There It Is" is a song by American singer Ginuwine. It was co-written by Harold Garvin, Cliff Jones, Bobby Terry, Jerry Vines, and Curtis Williams for his third studio album The Life (2001), while production was helmed by Jones and Vines for Big Dog Productions, with Ginuwine credited as a co-producer. The song was released as the album's lead single in January 2001 and peaked inside the Top 20 on the US Hot R&B/Hip-Hop Songs chart. The narrator describes how he works hard and pays the bills to provide a lifestyle for his live-in lover who does not have a job, but she does not show appreciation for what he does. Due to the content of the song (the use of the word "shit" in the bridge and chorus), a clean version tailor-made for radio play although only the original content was released on the album.

Track listing

Credits and personnel
Credits lifted from the liner notes of The Life.

Harold Garvin – writer
Cliff Jones – producer, writer
Ginuwine – co-production, vocals, writer
Bobby Terry – writer
Jerry Vines – producer, writer
Curtis Williams – writer

Charts

Weekly charts

Year-end charts

References	
	
	

2001 singles
Ginuwine songs
Songs written by Ginuwine
2000 songs
550 Music singles